The lowland leopard frog (Lithobates yavapaiensis) is a species of frog in the family Ranidae that is found in Mexico and the United States.

Its natural habitats are temperate forests, rivers, intermittent rivers, freshwater lakes, and freshwater marshes. It is not considered threatened by the IUCN.

References

 (1983): Phylogeny and biogeography of the Rana pipiens complex: A biochemical evaluation. Systematic Zoology' 32: 132–143.
 (1988): Systematics of the Rana pipiens complex: Puzzle and paradigm. Annual Review of Systematics and Ecology 19: 39–63.
 (2005): Phylogeny of the New World true frogs (Rana). Mol. Phylogenet. Evol. 34(2): 299–314.  PDF fulltext. 
 (2007) Constraints in naming parts of the Tree of Life. Mol. Phylogenet. Evol.'' 42: 331–338.

Amphibians of Mexico
Amphibians of the United States
Lithobates
Amphibians described in 1984
Taxonomy articles created by Polbot